The 2012–13 Evansville Purple Aces men's basketball team represented the University of Evansville during the 2012–13 NCAA Division I men's basketball season. The Purple Aces, led by sixth year head coach Marty Simmons, played their home games at the Ford Center and were members of the Missouri Valley Conference. They finished the season 21–15, 10–8 in MVC play to finish in fourth place. They lost in the quarterfinals of the Missouri Valley tournament to Indiana State. They were invited to the 2013 CIT where they defeated Tennessee State, Eastern Kentucky, and Canisius to advance to the semifinals where they lost to East Carolina. Senior guard Colt Ryan set the school's all-time record in scoring in the win at Canisius, and finished his career with 2,279 points; 43 points ahead of Larry Humes.

Roster

Schedule

|-
!colspan=9| Exhibition

|-
!colspan=9| Regular season

|-
!colspan=9| 2013 Missouri Valley Conference tournament

|-
!colspan=9| 2013 CIT

References

Evansville Purple Aces men's basketball seasons
Evansville
Evansville
Evans
Evans